Aleix Domínguez Hernández (born 28 April 1992) is a Spanish professional footballer who plays as a central midfielder.

Club career
Born in Barberà del Vallès, Barcelona, Catalonia, Domínguez began playing football with local team CEF Barberà Andalucía, followed by spells with CF Damm, RCD Espanyol, CF Badalona and CE Mercantil, finished his formation with Terrassa FC. On 27 June 2011, he signed with CE Sabadell FC, being assigned to B-team.

On 7 January 2012, Domínguez played his first match as a professional, coming on as a late substitute in a 1–4 home loss against Real Valladolid, in the Segunda División championship. In July 2015, he moved to UE Rubí.

References

External links

1992 births
Living people
People from Vallès Occidental
Sportspeople from the Province of Barcelona
Spanish footballers
Footballers from Catalonia
Association football midfielders
Segunda División players
Tercera División players
CF Damm players
CE Sabadell FC B players
CE Sabadell FC footballers